

Paleobotany

Newly described angiosperms

Conodonts

Newly named conodonts 
Stauffer & Plummer described the conodont genus Gondolella.

Archosauromorphs

Newly named basal archosauromorphs

Newly named pseudosuchians

Newly named dinosaurs
Data courtesy of George Olshevsky's dinosaur genera list.

Other diapsids

Synapsids

Non-mammalian

References

1930s in paleontology
Paleontology 2